Herkimer County is a county in the U.S. state of New York. As of the 2020 census, the population was 60,139. Its county seat is Herkimer. The county was created in 1791 north of the Mohawk River out of part of Montgomery County. It is named after General Nicholas Herkimer, who died from battle wounds in 1777 after taking part in the Battle of Oriskany during the Revolutionary War.

Herkimer County is part of the Utica–Rome Metropolitan Statistical Area.

History

In 1791, Herkimer County was created as one of three counties split off from Montgomery (the other two being Otsego and Tioga counties) as New York State was developed after the American Revolutionary War. Its area was much larger than the present county, however, and was reduced subsequently as more counties were organized.

Part of Herkimer County was included in the Macomb's Purchase of 1791, during the wide-scale sale of public lands after the state forced Iroquois tribes allied with the British during the war to cede their territory. Suddenly the state was selling  of land in upstate, central and western New York.

In 1794, Onondaga County was split off from Herkimer County. This county was larger than the current Onondaga County, and included the present Cayuga, Cortland, and part of Oswego counties.

In 1798, portions of Herkimer and Tioga counties were taken to form Chenango County.

Another part of Herkimer was split off to form Oneida County. It was then larger than the current Oneida County, including the present Jefferson, Lewis, and part of Oswego counties.

In 1802, parts of Herkimer, Clinton and Montgomery counties were combined to form the new St. Lawrence County.

The rural economy was first based on general agriculture and then wheat, but after the opening of the Erie Canal, Herkimer farmers found that they could not compete with grain farmers to the west. By the mid-19th century, they had begun to specialize in dairy farming and created a cheese industry that supplied the New York City market, among others.

During the American Civil War, Herkimer contributed five companies to the 34th New York Volunteer Infantry Regiment, leading to the unit's nickname "The Herkimer Regiment".

The Herkimer County Jail, constructed in 1834, was used to hold the murderer Chester Gillette before his trial at the Herkimer County Courthouse. The jail is now disused, except for tours by the Herkimer County Historical Society.

By the late 20th and early 21st centuries, some small farmers had begun to revive an artisan cheese industry and sustainable dairy farming here and in other parts of the central state. In 2008 New York had the third-largest milk production in the nation and was fourth-ranking in production of cheese, according to Cornell University. It has several inter-disciplinary programs related to the dairy industry.

The Herkimer County shootings took place  in 2013, killing five people.

Geography

Adjacent counties
 St. Lawrence County - north
 Hamilton County - northeast
 Fulton County - east
 Montgomery County - southeast
 Otsego County - south
 Oneida County - west
 Lewis County - northwest

Herkimer County is in central New York State, northwest of Albany, and east of Syracuse. The northern part of the county is in the Adirondack Park. The Mohawk River flows across the southern part of the county.

Demographics

2020 Census

2000 census
As of the census of 2000, there were 64,427 people, 25,734 households, and 17,113 families residing in the county. The population density was 46 people per square mile (18/km2). There were 32,026 housing units at an average density of 23 per square mile (9/km2). The racial makeup of the county was 97.83% White, 0.51% Black or African American, 0.22% Native American, 0.41% Asian, 0.02% Pacific Islander, 0.18% from other races, and 0.84% from two or more races. 0.90% of the population were Hispanic or Latino of any race. 20.6% were of Italian, 16.3% German, 13.9% Irish, 9.3% English, 7.7% Polish, 6.2% American and 5.2% French ancestry according to Census 2000. 95.2% spoke English, 1.2% Spanish and 1.1% Italian as their first language.

There were 25,734 households, out of which 30.60% had children under the age of 18 living with them, 51.20% were married couples living together, 10.30% had a female householder with no husband present, and 33.50% were non-families. 27.60% of all households were made up of individuals, and 13.70% had someone living alone who was 65 years of age or older. The average household size was 2.46 and the average family size was 2.99.

In the county, the population was spread out, with 24.40% under the age of 18, 8.30% from 18 to 24, 26.60% from 25 to 44, 24.00% from 45 to 64, and 16.80% who were 65 years of age or older. The median age was 39 years. For every 100 females there were 94.20 males. For every 100 females age 18 and over, there were 91.70 males.

The median income for a household in the county was $32,924, and the median income for a family was $40,570. Males had a median income of $29,908 versus $21,518 for females. The per capita income for the county was $16,141. About 8.90% of families and 12.50% of the population were below the poverty line, including 15.60% of those under age 18 and 10.40% of those age 65 or over.

Government and politics

|}

The Herkimer County Legislature consists of 17 members, each elected from single-member districts. 

Herkimer County is one of the most politically conservative counties in New York. Since 1884, it has voted for a Democratic presidential candidate only three times, with vote splitting due to a third-party candidate playing a role in two of those races.  the county legislature is almost entirely Republican: the single Democratic legislator also ran on the Conservative Party line.

The northern part of the county lies within New York's 21st congressional district, presently held by Republican Elise Stefanik. The southern part lies within New York's 22nd congressional district, presently held by Republican Claudia Tenney.

Economy
Herkimer County is known for producing unusually clear, doubly terminated quartz crystals, marketed as Herkimer diamonds.

Ilion in Herkimer County has one of two production sites of the Remington Arms Company, where many of the company's firearms are produced.

Education
Herkimer County Community College is located in the Village of Herkimer.

Transportation

Airport 
The following public use airport is located in the county:
 Frankfort-Highland Airport (6B4) – Frankfort

Rail 
Passenger rail service by Amtrak is available at Utica, nearby to the west of the county. Up to the latter 1950s, New York Central Railroad trains such as the North Shore Limited (New York-Chicago) made stops at Little Falls. Until 1965, the New York Central operated passenger trains through Thendara in the upper part of the county.

Roads 
Interstate 90, as part of the New York State Thruway, runs east–west through the lower part of the county, as does New York State Route 5. State Route 28 runs north–south through the county.

Communities

Larger Settlements

Towns

 Columbia
 Danube
 Fairfield
 Frankfort
 German Flatts
 Herkimer
 Litchfield
 Little Falls
 Manheim
 Newport
 Norway
 Ohio
 Russia
 Salisbury
 Schuyler
 Stark
 Warren
 Webb
 Winfield

Hamlets
 Beaver River
 Jordanville
 Newville

See also

 List of counties in New York
 List of New York State Historic Markers in Herkimer County, New York
 National Register of Historic Places listings in Herkimer County, New York

References

Further reading

External links

 Herkimer County official website
 President Benjamin Harrison's Summer home
 
 Herkimer County history pages
 Herkimer County Historical Society website

 
Utica–Rome metropolitan area
1791 establishments in New York (state)
Populated places established in 1791